Henry Brydges  may refer to:

Henry Brydges (died 1539), MP for Ludgershall
Henry Brydges, 2nd Duke of Chandos (1708–1771)
Henry James Brydges, 1st Duke of Chandos (1673–1744)

See also
Henry Bridges (disambiguation)